Eugene Moore, Sr. (November 10, 1886 – August 31, 1938), nicknamed "Blue Goose",  was a left-handed pitcher in Major League Baseball who played for the Pittsburgh Pirates (1909–1910) and Cincinnati Reds (1912). Moore was born in Lancaster, Texas. His son, Gene Jr, was an All-Star outfielder who played for seven major league teams from 1931 through 1945.  
 
In a three-season career, Moore posted a 2–2 record with 17 strikeouts and a 4.76 ERA in 34.0 innings pitched. 
 
Moore died in Dallas, Texas, at the age of 51.

External links
Baseball Reference - career statistics and analysis

Cincinnati Reds players
Pittsburgh Pirates players
Major League Baseball pitchers
Baseball players from Texas
1886 births
1938 deaths
Dallas Giants players
Galveston Pirates players
Galveston Sand Crabs players
Houston Buffaloes players
Dallas Marines players
Dallas Steers players
People from Lancaster, Texas